The Mongolia men's national 3x3 team is a national basketball team of Mongolia, administered by the Mongolian Basketball Association. It represents the country in international 3x3 (3 against 3) basketball competitions.

Even though Mongolia is one of FIBA Asias youngest members, its national 3x3 basketball team already had some noteworthy international accomplishments.

The Mongolian team made their debut in the FIBA 3x3 World Cup in 2018. They qualified for the 2018 edition of the tournament through their association's FIBA 3x3 Federation World Ranking.

Tournament records

World Cup

FIBA 3x3 U 23 World Cup

Asian Games

Asia Cup

World Beach Games

See also
Mongolia national basketball team
Mongolia women's national 3x3 team
Ulaanbaatar MMC Energy
https://en.wikipedia.org/wiki/Draft:Sansar_MMC_energy

References

3x3
Men's national 3x3 basketball teams